St. Paul's Church is a historic church at 55 Main Street in the village of Wickford within the town of North Kingstown, Rhode Island.  It is a single-story Romanesque Revival structure, designed by Rhode Island architect Thomas Tefft and built in 1847. Its main rectangular block has a gable roof, and narrow round-arch windows on the side walls with molded surrounds.  The front of the church is asymmetrical, with the tower on the left and its entry slightly off-center between the tower and a small projecting narthex area.  The square tower has single narrow round-arch windows on the first level, paired round-arch windows on the second, and clock faces on the third.  A roof skirt rises to an open octagonal belfry, which is capped by a steeple and spire.

The church was listed on the National Register of Historic Places in 1972.

See also
Old Narragansett Church, also sometimes called St. Paul's
National Register of Historic Places listings in Washington County, Rhode Island

References

External links
St. Paul's Church in Wickford

Episcopal churches in Rhode Island
Buildings and structures in North Kingstown, Rhode Island
Churches in Washington County, Rhode Island
Churches completed in 1847
1847 establishments in Rhode Island
19th-century Episcopal church buildings
Churches on the National Register of Historic Places in Rhode Island
National Register of Historic Places in Washington County, Rhode Island
Gothic Revival church buildings in Rhode Island